Primetime Balita was a late evening news broadcast of Radio Philippines Network (RPN), aired from July 3, 2000 to August 10, 2001. It was RPN's first and only late-night news program in Filipino language.

Anchors
Buddy Lopa (2000-2001)
Angelique Lazo (2000-2001)
Marigold Haber-Dunca (2001)

See also
RPN News and Public Affairs
List of programs previously broadcast by Radio Philippines Network

Philippine television news shows
2000 Philippine television series debuts
2001 Philippine television series endings
Filipino-language television shows
Radio Philippines Network news shows
RPN News and Public Affairs shows
Flagship evening news shows